Taghrid Qindil (born 1967) is a Jordanian short story writer.

Born in Irbid, Qindil possesses a bachelor's degree in English literature. She received the Prize for Young Writers from the League of Jordanian Writers in 1985–1986; in 1987 she received the al-Dustur Cultural Supplement Prize. Two volumes of her short stories had been published as of 1999.

References

1967 births
Living people
People from Irbid
Jordanian short story writers
Jordanian women writers
Women short story writers
20th-century short story writers
20th-century women writers